MessageNet systems is a privately held company which sells a primarily software-based product called "Connections" for facilitating an organization's emergency and routine communications.

Company overview 
MessageNet systems is located in Carmel, Indiana, United States, and is active in much of the country  Its primary product is called "Connections", which may consist of any combination of several features and capabilities (which are outlined and explained briefly, later in this article), depending on the organization's needs.

Market involvement 
MessageNet systems participates in the marketplace via direct sales, partnerships with resellers, and agreements with other third parties. As part of its sales efforts and expansion goals, the company recently participated in the Channel Partners Conference and Expo, in Las Vegas.

Timeline 

 1991 - Founded with the name "Orchid Systems."
 1996 - Changed name to "MessageNet Systems" and adopted a corresponding logo.
 2011 - MessageNet became more active in education-oriented video production (in addition to marketing), and started a company YouTube channel.
 2012 - Changed branding with an updated logo, color scheme, and slightly modified its name (as represented in its logo, visible right) to be "MessageNet systems" rather than "MessageNet Systems" (the difference being the lower-case "s" in "systems").

Product 

MessageNet's main (and only) offering is an all-encompassing product called "Connections."

Connections 
Connections is a broad product that may include several different features & capabilities, depending on the customer's needs. Notable environments that this product may be well-suited for, include:
 Noisy manufacturing environments, where traditional PA systems may not be effective
 Sprawling campus settings which require a mass notification capability, as well as discrete room or location-based ability to focus specific communications
 Schools for the deaf and blind, where equal access to education, everyday, and emergency information is challenging to achieve

Connections is an example of an emergency communication system. According to the company's marketing materials, "MessageNet Connections is a browser-based, integrated system that unifies private and public, everyday and emergency communications into one powerful system. Connections integrates your existing communication systems to create communication bridges between people, places, and things. One of the unique advantages of the MessageNet Connections system is scalability: you can start with your specific needs now, and later uniquely upgrade your system to include additional functionality." 
 MediaPort — A digital signage system, using high-definition flat panel displays to display many types of media, including presentation-style slide-shows, high-definition video, emergency evacuation routing, two-way video-conferencing, photographs, text messages, and scrolling news tickers, for both daily and emergency uses. 
 Visual PA — A system designed to deliver visual public address messages from any authorized PC running a browser to electronic LED sign boards in one room, throughout an entire campus, or across a WAN. 
 PC Alert — Delivers alert and emergency messages to any, or all, PCs on a network by popping a message up as a window and scrolling it until a person or an event terminates it. 
 PageStation — An advanced text messaging software system that provides real-time text messaging to pagers, PDAs, Twitter, and cell phones, from any authorized computer on a network. 
 MESA — Enterprise Security & Alerting features that integrate and enhance an existing building's automation, fire safety, and security systems. It adapts and prioritizes alerts from a variety of safety and security systems for delivery to any of the spectrum of communication devices used in the enterprise. 
 CallVista — A voice communication system that integrates desk phones, home phones, cell phones, wireless phones and videophones. It includes an autodialing phone directory, in/out whiteboard functionality, and more. 
 SecurePA — The software interface that extends the utility, security, and ease-of-use of Overhead Paging, Intercom, Mass Notification and PA systems.

Alternative product names 
Throughout the company's history and growth their main product has evolved, and consequently, undergone several name changes. Following are some of these:
 Silent Messenger 
 Visual Intercom
 EMACS (Emergency Management and Communications System)

Customer service 
MessageNet systems' primary focus is in offering its Connections product; however, the company does provide some services to customers who have purchased, or are in the process of purchasing Connections. MessageNet provides customer service as well as installation and upgrade support.

Primary markets 
MessageNet is active in these markets:
 Industrial manufacturing environments
 Retail establishments
 Universities and higher education
 A MessageNet-derivative system is currently being used at Gulf Coast Community College. 
 Deaf and blind schools
 Mississippi School for the Deaf — According to the Tech Bytes newsletter, this school has implemented Connections to serve as an Emergency System with the following features: 
 Allow staff to react more quickly to incidents; 
 A Security System that will monitor students, as well as reduce misconduct, vandalism, and theft;
 An Electronic School Bulletin Board that will display schools events, lunch menus, or a calendar of events to any TV on campus;
 A Virtual Media Cart that will play and control tapes, and/or DVDs in a classroom without a player, media, or remote control;
 A Video Contact System that will enable real-time video conversations with staff members;
 An Off-Campus Control and Monitoring System that allows responsible parties to view cameras and control devices remotely via the Internet;
 A Broadcast System in which announcements can be made for both the hearing and sight-impaired student;
 A Professional Development System that will allow teaching of a class to multiple classrooms simultaneously, or connect the classroom to an existing distance learning class or learning lab.
 Hospitals and medical facilities

References 

Fire detection and alarm companies
Emergency population warning systems
Emergency services equipment makers
Carmel, Indiana
Articles containing video clips